James Hatfield (1958–2001) was the American author.

James Hatfield may also refer to:

James F. Hatfield, namesake of Hatfield, Kentucky
James Hatfield, athlete in the 1930 NCAA Track and Field Championships
James Taft Hatfield (1862–1945), American philologist and professor at Northwestern University

See also
 James Hadfield (1772–1841), a.k.a. James Hatfield, British attempted assassin
 James Hetfield (born 1963), American musician